Buddy Wayne Knox (July 20, 1933 – February 14, 1999) was an American singer and songwriter, best known for his 1957 rock hit song, "Party Doll".

Biography
Knox was born in the tiny farming community of Happy, Texas, United States, and learned to play the guitar in his youth. In his teens,  he and some high-school friends formed a band called the "Rhythm Orchids". After they performed on the same 1956 radio show as fellow Texan Roy Orbison and his "Teen Kings" band, Orbison suggested that Knox go to record producer Norman Petty, who had a recording studio in Clovis, New Mexico, the same studio where Buddy Holly recorded several of his early hits, including "That'll Be the Day".

Knox's song "Party Doll" was released on the Roulette record label, and went to number one on  the Cash Box record chart in 1957 (after being picked from the tiny Triple-D label). It sold over one million copies, and was awarded a gold disc by the RIAA. This success was followed by "Rock Your Little Baby To Sleep", a number-17 hit, and "Hula Love", a number-9 hit.  While he never achieved the same level of artistic success as Holly or Orbison, Knox outlived both and enjoyed a long career in music.  For his pioneering contribution, Knox was elected to the Rockabilly Hall of Fame. "Party Doll" was voted one of the Rock and Roll Hall of Fame's 500 Songs that Shaped Rock and Roll.

In the early 1960s, Knox signed with Liberty Records and released several more mainstream pop records, featuring string arrangements and backing vocalists. "Lovey Dovey" and "Ling-Ting-Tong" were the most notable recordings from this era. The sound captured on these recordings was a distinct departure from his earlier rockabilly work for Roulette. Liberty and principal record producer Snuff Garrett successfully employed the same production techniques for their other mainstream pop artists of the time, which included Johnny Burnette and Bobby Vee.

In 1968, Knox, who had been living in semiretirement in Macon, Georgia, while running his publishing company, moved to Nashville, Tennessee, and signed a new recording contract with United Artists Records. Working with producer Bob Montgomery (songwriter), Knox honed his traditional rockabilly style more toward the modern country sound of the day. His first album on United Artists earned him the nickname by which he would be known for the remainder of his life. The title song of the album, Gypsy Man, written by Sonny Curtis and featuring Curtis' acoustic guitar work, received airplay on country music radio stations.

Several singles recorded by Knox between 1968 and 1974 were notable for his experimenting with a variety of sounds and styles, and from a creative and critical standpoint, may have been his most productive era.  His version of Delaney Bramlett's "God Knows I Love You", along with his self-penned "Salt Lake City", placed Knox firmly in the midst of the new pop-music genre, being populated by artists such as Delaney & Bonnie, Eric Clapton, and others who were on the leading edge of the developing Southern rock style such as Black Oak Arkansas and the Allman Brothers Band. His cover version of James Hendricks' "Glory Train" was another stylistic stretch and featured a gospel-like chorus of backing vocalists. His cover of the Fleetwoods' "Come Softly to Me" demonstrated a vocal range not heard on his older recordings. He also reached out to the new generation of songwriters who would become prominent during Nashville's "Outlaw era" of the 1970s, as he was one of the first artists to record Mickey Newbury's "I'm Only Rockin'". Several other major country music artists later recorded this song, but under the alternate title of "T. Total Tommy". Knox also recorded songs by Alex Harvey, John D. Loudermilk, and Gary Paxton. On several of these recordings, Knox experimented with multitracking, something few artists had done up to that time.

For many decades from the 1970s to the 1990s, Knox was based in the small town of Dominion City, Manitoba, Canada, and toured primarily in Western Canada and upper Midwest U.S. with occasional European appearances. In 1981, he starred in an independent Canadian movie Sweet Country Road.
 
He said the fame took a toll on his family life. Traveling 250 days a year for 35 years, he was voted "the most traveling entertainer in the world" by Billboard magazine, but he said it cost three marriages for him.

In 1992, he divorced and moved to British Columbia, where he was involved in several business ventures including a partnership in a local British Columbia nightclub.

His son, Michael Knox, is a record producer.

Death 

Moving to Port Orchard, Washington, in 1997 to be with his fiancée, he experienced a fall and injured his hip. The doctor informed him at that time that he had terminal lung cancer. Knox scheduled a farewell show, but died just a few weeks later on February 14, 1999, in Bremerton, Washington. He is interred in Dreamland Cemetery, in Canyon, Texas.

Discography

Compilation albums
Buddy Knox — Greatest Hits — all the Roulette and Liberty recordings
 "Party Doll" (1957, US no. 1, UK no. 29)
 "Storm Clouds" (1957)
 "That's Why I Cry" (1959, US no. 88)
 "Hula Love" (1957, US no. 12)
 "C'mon Baby" (1959)
 "All For You" (1959)
 "I Think I'm Gonna Kill Myself" (1959, US no. 55)
 "Lovey Dovey" (1961, US no. 25)
 "Ling-Ting-Tong" (1961, US no. 65)
 "Somebody Touched Me" (1958, US no. 22)
 "Rock Your Little Baby to Sleep" (1957)
 "Cause I'm In Love" (1957)
 "Swinging Daddy" (1958, US no. 80)
 "The Girl with the Golden Hair" (1959)
 "Devil Woman" (1957)
 "Mary Lou" (1957)
 "Rock House" (1957)
 "Maybellinne" (1957)
 "Rock Around the Clock" (1957)
 "She's Gone" (1962, UK no. 45)
 "Slippin' and Slidin'" (1962)
 "Chi-Hua-Hua" (1962)
 "OPEN YOUR LOVIN' ARMS" (1962)
 "Dear Abby" (1962)
 "Three Eyed Man" (1962)
 "Tomorrow is a Comin'" (1963)
 "Hitch Hike Back To Georgia" (1963)
 "I Got You" (1960)
 "I Ain't Sharin' Sharon" (1959)
 "I'm in Love With You" (1957)
 "Long Lonely Nights" (1960)
 "Good Time Girl" (1965)
 "Livin' in a House Full of Love" (1965)
 "Love Has Many Ways" (1965)
 "Teasable, Pleasable You" (1959, US no. 85)

Singles

 A"Gypsy Man" peaked at #64 on Billboard Country charts

References

External links
Rockabilly Hall page
[ Allmusic]

1933 births
1999 deaths
Musicians from Amarillo, Texas
Musicians from Manitoba
Songwriters from Texas
American rockabilly musicians
Apex Records artists
Charly Records artists
Liberty Records artists
Deaths from lung cancer
Deaths from cancer in Washington (state)
Roulette Records artists
20th-century American singers
People from Happy, Texas
Country musicians from Texas
20th-century American male singers
American male songwriters